The giant anteater (Myrmecophaga tridactyla) is an insectivorous mammal native to Central and South America. It is one of four living species of anteaters, of which it is the largest member. The only extant member of the genus Myrmecophaga, it is classified with sloths in the order Pilosa. This species is mostly terrestrial, in contrast to other living anteaters and sloths, which are arboreal or semiarboreal. It is recognizable by its elongated snout, bushy tail, long fore claws, and distinctively colored pelage.

The giant anteater is found in multiple habitats, including grassland and rainforest. It forages in open areas and rests in more forested habitats. It feeds primarily on ants and termites, using its fore claws to dig them up and its long, sticky tongue to collect them. Though giant anteaters live in overlapping home ranges, they are mostly solitary except during mother-offspring relationships, aggressive interactions between males, and when mating. Mother anteaters carry their offspring on their backs until weaning them.

The giant anteater is listed as vulnerable by the International Union for Conservation of Nature. It has been extirpated from many parts of its former range. Threats to its survival include habitat destruction, fire, and poaching for fur and bushmeat, although some anteaters inhabit protected areas.  With its distinctive appearance and habits, the anteater has been featured in pre-Columbian myths and folktales, as well as modern popular culture.

Taxonomy and phylogeny
The giant anteater got its binomial name from Carl Linnaeus in 1758. Its generic name, Myrmecophaga, and specific name, tridactyla, are both Greek, meaning "anteater" and "three fingers", respectively. Myrmecophaga jubata was used as a synonym. Three subspecies have been tentatively proposed: M. t. tridactyla (ranging from Venezuela and the Guianas to northern Argentina), M. t. centralis (native to Central America, northwestern Colombia, and northern Ecuador), and M. t. artata (native to northeastern Colombia and northwestern Venezuela). The giant anteater is grouped with the semiarboreal northern and southern tamanduas in the family Myrmecophagidae. Together with the family Cyclopedidae, whose only extant member is the arboreal silky anteater, the two families comprise the suborder Vermilingua.

Anteaters and sloths belong to order Pilosa and share superorder Xenarthra with the Cingulata (whose only extant members are armadillos). The two orders of Xenarthra split 66 million years ago (Mya) during the Late Cretaceous epoch. Anteaters and sloths diverged around 55 Mya, between the Paleocene and Eocene epochs. The Cyclopes lineage emerged around 30 Mya in the Oligocene epoch, while the Myrmecophaga and Tamandua lineages split 10 Mya in the Late Miocene subepoch. During most of the Cenozoic era, anteaters were confined to South America, which was formerly an island continent. Following the formation of the Isthmus of Panama about 3 Mya, anteaters of all three extant genera invaded Central America as part of the Great American Interchange.

The fossil record for anteaters is generally sparse. Known fossils include the Pliocene genus Palaeomyrmidon, a close relative to the silky anteater, Protamandua, the sister taxon to the clade that includes the giant anteater and the tamanduas from the Miocene, and Neotamandua, a sister taxon to Myrmecophaga. Protamandua was larger than the silky anteater, but smaller than a tamandua, while Neotamandua was larger, falling somewhere between a tamandua and a giant anteater. Protamandua did not appear to have feet specialized for terrestrial or arboreal locomotion, but it may have had a prehensile tail. Neotamandua, though, is unlikely to have had a prehensile tail and its feet were intermediate in form between those of the tamanduas and the giant anteater. The species Neotamandua borealis was suggested to be an ancestor of the latter. Another member of the genus Myrmecophaga has been recovered from the Montehermosan Monte Hermoso Formation in Argentina and was described by Kraglievitch in 1934 as Nunezia caroloameghinoi. The species was reclassified as Myrmecophaga caroloameghinoi by S. E. Hirschfeld in 1976.

The giant anteater is the most terrestrial of the living anteater species. Its ancestors may originally have been adapted to arboreal life; the transition to life on the ground could have been aided by the expansion of open habitats such as savanna in South America and the availability there of colonial insects, such as termites, that provided a larger potential food source. Both the giant anteater and the southern tamandua are well represented in the fossil record of the late Pleistocene and early Holocene.

Characteristics and adaptations

The giant anteater can be identified by its large size, elongated muzzle, and long bushy tail. Males weigh  and females weigh , making the giant anteater the biggest extant species in its suborder. Its tubular snout, which ends in its tiny mouth opening and nostrils, takes up most of its head. Its eyes and ears are relatively small. It has poor eyesight, but its sense of smell is 40 times more sensitive than that of humans.

Even for an anteater, the neck is especially thick compared to the back of the head, and a small hump is found at the back of the neck. The coat is mostly greyish, brown or black and salted with white. The forelimbs are white, with black bands around the wrists, while the hindlimbs are dark. Thick black bands with white outlines stretch from throat to shoulder, ending in triangular points. The body ends in a brown tail. The coat hairs are long, especially on the tail, which makes the tail look larger than it actually is. A stiff mane stretches along the back. The bold pattern was thought to be disruptive camouflage, but a 2009 study suggests it is warning coloration. While adult males are slightly larger and more muscular than females, with wider heads and necks, visual sex determination can be difficult. The penis and testes are located internally between the rectum and urinary bladder in males, and females have a single pair of mammary glands near the armpits.

The giant anteater has broad ribs. Despite its specific name, tridactyla, meaning three fingers, it has five toes on each foot. Four toes on the front feet have claws, which are particularly elongated on the second and third digits. It walks on its front knuckles similar to gorillas and chimpanzees. Doing this allows the giant anteater to keep its claws out of the way while walking. The middle digits, which support most of its weight, are extended at the metacarpophalangeal joints and bent at the interphalangeal joints. Unlike the front feet, the hind feet have short claws on all five toes and walk plantigrade. As a "hook-and-pull" digger, the giant anteater's enlarged supraspinous fossa gives the teres major more leverage—increasing the front limbs' pulling power—and the triceps muscle helps power the flexion of the thickened third digit of the front feet.

Xenarthrans in general tend to have lower metabolic rates than most other mammals, a trend thought to correlate with their dietary specializations and low mobility.

Feeding anatomy 

The giant anteater has no teeth and is capable of only very limited jaw movement. It relies on the rotation of the two halves of its lower jaw, held together by a ligament at the tip, to open and close its mouth. This is accomplished by its chewing muscles, which are relatively underdeveloped. Jaw depression creates an oral opening large enough for the slender tongue to flick out. The tongue is covered in backward-curving papillae and coated in thick, sticky saliva secreted from its enlarged salivary glands.

The tube-like rostrum and small mouth opening restrict the tongue to protrusion-retraction movements. During feeding, the animal relies on the orientation of its head for aim. The anteater's tongue has little to no attachments to the hyoid and this is what allows it to flick its tongue at such distances and speed. The long sternoglossus muscle, which is formed by the fusion of the sternohyoid and the hyoglossus, is directly anchored to the sternum. The hyoid apparatus is large, V-shaped and flexible and supports the tongue as it goes in and out of the mouth. The buccinators allow it to slide back in without losing attached food and tighten the mouth to prevent food from escaping as it extends. When retracted, the tongue is held in the oropharynx by the secondary palate, preventing it from blocking respiration.

Giant anteaters swallow at a much higher rate than most other mammals; when feeding, they swallow almost continuously. Before being swallowed, insects are crushed against the palate. The giant anteater's stomach, similar to a bird's gizzard, has hardened folds and uses strong contractions to grind up the insects. The digestive process is assisted by small amounts of ingested sand and soil. The giant anteater cannot produce stomach acid of its own, but uses the formic acid of its prey for digestion.

Distribution and status 

The giant anteater is native to Central and South America. Its known range stretches from Honduras to the Gran Chaco region, and fossil remains have been found as far north as northwestern Sonora, Mexico. It is largely absent from the Andes and has been fully extirpated in Uruguay, Belize, El Salvador, and Guatemala, as well as in parts of Costa Rica, Brazil, Argentina, and Paraguay. The species is found in a number of habitats including both tropical rainforest and xeric shrubland, provided enough prey is present to sustain it.

The species is listed as vulnerable by the International Union for Conservation of Nature, due to the number of regional extirpations, and under Appendix II by CITES, tightly restricting international trade in specimens of the animal and its parts and derivatives. Between 2000 and 2010, the total population declined by 30%. In 1994, some 340 giant anteaters died due to wildfires at Emas National Park in Brazil. The animal is particularly vulnerable to fires due to its slow movement and flammable coat.

Human-induced threats include collision with vehicles, attacks by dogs, and destruction of habitat. One study of anteater mortality along roads found that they are likely to become roadkill on straight roads with native vegetation along the side. A 2018 study in Brazil found that: (1) fragmentation of habitat could be more detrimental than road mortality, (2) 18–21% of suitable anteater habitat was below minimum patch size, (3) 0.1–1% of its distribution was maximum road density, (4) 32–36% of the anteater's range represented critical areas for its survival and (5) more conservation opportunities existed in the north of the country. A 2020 study in the Brazilian Cerrado found that road morality can decrease the local population growth by half.

The giant anteater is commonly hunted in Bolivia, both for sport and sustenance. The animal's thick, leathery hide is used to make equestrian equipment in the Chaco. In Venezuela, it is hunted for its claws. Giant anteaters are killed for safety reasons, due to their reputation as dangerous animals. The giant anteater remains widespread. Some populations are stable and the animal is found in various protected areas in the Amazon, Pantanal and the Cerrado. It is officially protected in some Argentine provinces as a national heritage species.

Behavior and ecology 

The giant anteater may use multiple habitats. A 2007 study of giant anteaters in the Brazilian Pantanal found the animals generally forage in open areas and rest in forested areas, possibly because forests are warmer than grasslands on cold days and cooler on hot days. Giant anteaters can be either diurnal or nocturnal. A 2006 study in the Pantanal found those anteaters to be mostly nocturnal: they are most active during nighttime and early morning, and retire as the temperature rises. On colder days, they start and end periods of activity earlier, shifting them into daylight hours, and may become diurnal. Diurnal giant anteaters have been observed at Serra da Canastra. Nocturnality in anteaters may be a response to human disturbances.

Giant anteaters typically rest in dense brush, but may use tall grass on cooler days. They carve a shallow cavity in the ground for resting. The animal sleeps curled up with its bushy tail folded over its body. The tail serves both to conserve body heat and as camouflage.

Giant anteaters are good swimmers and are capable of moving through wide rivers. They have been observed to bathe. They are also able to climb and have been recorded ascending both termite mounds and trees while foraging. One individual was observed holding onto a branch with its feet just touching the ground.

Spacing 

Individuals mostly live alone, except for females that nurse their young and males courting females. Anteaters communicate their presence, status, and sexual condition with secretions from their anal glands. They also advertise their presence to other individuals though tree markings and urine. They appear to be able to recognize each other's saliva by scent.

Females appear to be more tolerant of females than males are of males, leading to greater overlap in female home ranges. Males are more likely to engage in agonistic behaviors, such as slowly circling each other, chasing, or actual fighting. Circling anteaters may utter a drawn-out "harrr" noise. In combat, they slash at each other with their claws and wrestle each other to the ground. Fighting anteaters may emit roars or bellows. Males are possibly territorial.

Foraging 

This animal is an insectivore, feeding mostly on ants or termites. In areas that experience seasonal flooding, like the grassy plains of the Venezuelan-Colombian Llanos, anteaters mainly feed on ants, because termites are less available. Conversely, anteaters at Emas National Park eat mainly termites, which occur in high density on the grasslands. At Serra da Canastra, anteaters switch between eating mainly ants during the wet season (October to March) and termites during the dry season (May to September).

Anteaters track prey by their scent. After finding a nest, the animal tears it open with its long fore claws and inserts its long, sticky tongue to collect its prey (which includes eggs, larvae and adult insects). An anteater spends one minute on average feeding at a nest, visiting up to 200 nests in one day and consuming as many as 30,000 insects. The anteater may be driven away from a nest by the chemical or biting attacks of soldiers. Some termite species rely on their fortified mounds for protection and many individuals escape while the predator digs. These modes of defense prevent the entire colony from being eaten in one anteater attack.

Other prey include the larvae of beetles and western honey bees that have located their hives in termite mounds. Anteaters may target termite mounds with bee hives. They may sometimes eat fruit. In captivity, anteaters are fed mixtures made of milk, eggs, mealworms, and ground beef. To drink, an anteater may dig for water when no surface water is available, creating waterholes for other animals.

Reproduction and parenting 

Giant anteaters can mate throughout the year. During courtship, a male consorts with an estrous female, following and sniffing her. Male and female pairs are known to feed at the same insect nest. While mating, the female lies on her side as the male crouches over her. A couple may stay together for up to three days and mate several times during that period. Females give birth standing upright.

Pups are born with eyes closed and begin to open them after six days. The mother carries its dependent pup on its back. The pup's black and white band aligns with its mother's, camouflaging it. The young communicate with their mothers with sharp whistles and use their tongues during nursing. After three months, the pup begins to eat solid food and is fully weaned by ten months. The mother grooms her offspring during rest periods lasting up to an hour. Grooming peaks during the first three months and declines as the young reaches nine months of age, ending by ten months. The decline mirrors that of the weakening bond between mother and offspring; young anteaters usually become independent by nine or ten months. Anteaters are sexually mature in 2.5–4 years.

Mortality
Giant anteaters can live around 16 years in captivity. They are primarily prey for jaguars and pumas and typically flee from danger by galloping, but if cornered, will rear up on their hind legs and slash at the attacker. The front claws of the giant anteater are formidable weapons, capable of scaring off a jaguar. The giant anteater is a host of the Acanthocephalan intestinal parasites Gigantorhynchus echinodiscus and Moniliformis monoechinus.

Interactions with humans

Attacks
Although they are shy and typically attempt to avoid humans, giant anteaters can inflict severe wounds with their front claws and have been known to seriously injure or kill humans who corner and threaten them. Between 2010 and 2012, two hunters were killed by giant anteaters in Brazil; in both cases, the hunters were agitating and wounding cornered animals and the attacks appeared to be defensive behaviors. In April 2007, an anteater at the Florencio Varela Zoo mauled and killed a zookeeper with its front claws. The animal in question, a male named Ramon, had a reputation for aggressiveness.

In culture 

In the mythology and folklore of the indigenous peoples of the Amazon Basin, the giant anteater is depicted as a trickster foil to the jaguar, as well as a humorous figure due to its long snout. In one Shipib tale, an anteater challenged a jaguar to a breath-holding contest under water, which the jaguar accepted. After the two removed their pelts and submerged, the anteater jumped out of the water and stole the jaguar's pelt, leaving the jaguar with the anteater's pelt. In a Yarabara myth, the evil ogre Ucara is transformed into one by the sun. This myth emphasizes the nearly immobile nature of the anteater's mouth, which was considered a burden. The Kayapo people wear masks of various animals and spirits, including the anteater, during naming and initiation ceremonies. They believe women who touched anteater masks or men who stumbled while wearing them would die or receive some sort of physical disorder.

During the Spanish colonization of the Americas, the giant anteater was one of many native fauna taken to Europe for display. At first, Europeans believed all anteaters were female and mated with their noses, a misconception corrected by naturalist Félix de Azara. In the 20th century, Salvador Dalí wrote imaginatively that the giant anteater "reaches sizes bigger than the horse, possesses enormous ferocity, has exceptional muscle power, is a terrifying animal." Dalí depicted an anteater in the style of The Great Masturbator. It was used as a bookplate for André Breton, who compared the temptations a man experiences in life to what "the tongue of the anteater must offer to the ant."

The 1940 Max Fleischer cartoon Ants in the Plants features a colony of ants fighting off a villainous anteater. Released during the Phoney War, the film may have alluded to France's Maginot Line. An anteater is also a recurring character in the comic strip B.C. This character was the inspiration for Peter the Anteater, the University of California, Irvine team mascot. In the Stephen King miniseries Kingdom Hospital, the character Antubis appears in the form of an anteater-like creature with razor-sharp teeth.

References

External links 

 The Online Anteater: information, images, fun facts, and other stuff about the giant anteater 
 ARKive – images and movies of the giant anteater.
 Anteater, Sloth & Armadillo Specialist Group  –  Giant anteater
 Animal Diversity Web  –  Myrmecophaga tridactyla Giant anteater

Anteaters
Mammals of Central America
Mammals of South America
Anteater, giant
Anteater, giant
Anteater, giant
Anteater, giant
Vulnerable animals
Vulnerable biota of South America
Extant Zanclean first appearances
Pleistocene mammals of South America
Pliocene mammals of South America
Mammals described in 1758
Taxa named by Carl Linnaeus